Melanoplus strumosus, known generally as the swollen short-wing grasshopper or swollen spur-throat grasshopper, is a species of spur-throated grasshopper in the family Acrididae. It is found in Central America.

References

Melanoplinae
Articles created by Qbugbot
Insects described in 1904